Roman Anatolyevich Studnev (born 26 January 1978) is a former Russian professional football player.

Club career
He played 4 seasons in the Russian Football National League for FC Dynamo Stavropol .

Honours
 Russian Second Division Zone Centre best defender: 2010.

References

External links
 

1978 births
Sportspeople from Stavropol
Living people
Russian footballers
Association football defenders
FC Dynamo Stavropol players